Toba River may refer to:
Toba River (British Columbia), a river in British Columbia, Canada
Toba River (Gifu), a river in Gifu Prefecture, Japan